The mausoleum known as Hazira at Vadodara, Gujarat, India; contains the tombs of Qutb-ud-din Muhammad Khan who was the tutor of Salim, son and successor of Akbar, and also that of his son Naurang Khan who held important offices in Gujarat under Akbar. Qutb-ud-din was uncle of Mirza Aziz Koka, a foster brother of Akbar and the Governor of Gujarat thrice in between 1573 AD to 1583 AD. He was killed in 1583 by Muzaffar Shah III, the last sultan of Gujarat Sultanate.

Built on high octagonal platform with smaller gates on the cardinal directions and five arches on each side. It is in the style of Mughal tombs at Delhi. The real grave is in an underground chamber and the false grave in the tomb chamber. The Quranic texts in Arabic are carved, inside tomb chamber, on lintels, arches and also above Jali work on eastern side walls. The extant parapet wall on the roof terrace is embellished with Merlon designs in brick red color evident from the traces. The lower portion of cylindrical dome surrounding the tomb was covered with thick plaster of brick red color.
 
The mausoleum has a double dome and seems to have been a garden tomb and vav or stepwell to its across west the modern road was perhaps used for supplying the water to the garden. fjf

Gallery

References 

Tourist attractions in Vadodara
Mausoleums in Gujarat
Mughal tombs
Archaeological sites in Gujarat
Buildings and structures completed in 1586
1586 in India
Monuments of National Importance in Gujarat